Marjorie Magner (born c. 1950) is an American business executive. She is the co-founder of Brysam Global Partners, a private equity firm, and she serves as the chairman of the Gannett Corporation.

Education
Marjorie Magner was born c. 1950. She graduated from Brooklyn College, where she received a Bachelor of Science degree in psychology in 1969. She then received an MSIA degree from the Krannert School of Management at Purdue University.

Career
Magner held various positions within Citigroup Inc., including senior executive vice president and head of consumer banking, from 2003 to 2005.

Magner is the co-founder of Brysam Global Partners, a private equity firm where she serves as a managing partner. Additionally, she serves as the non-executive chairman of the board of directors of both the Gannett Corporation and  Accenture PLC.

Magner also serves on the board of directors of Ally Financial Inc.

Magner was named as one of the Most Powerful Women in Business from 2001–2004 in the Fortune magazine list and was ranked #19 in the Forbes magazine list of World's Most Powerful Women.

Philanthropy
Magner serves on the board of trustees of the Brooklyn College Foundation, a fundraising organization for her alma mater.

References

Living people
Brooklyn College alumni
Krannert School of Management alumni
American chairpersons of corporations
American media executives
American women business executives
Citigroup employees
American financial company founders
American women company founders
American company founders
Women corporate directors
Businesspeople in mass media
Gannett people
Ally Financial
Accenture people
American bankers
American women investors
Technology corporate directors
Year of birth missing (living people)
21st-century American businesswomen
21st-century American businesspeople